This is a complete list of school districts in the US state of Delaware.

Public school districts

Appoquinimink School District
Brandywine School District
Caesar Rodney School District
Cape Henlopen School District
Capital School District
Christina School District
Colonial School District
Delmar School District
Indian River School District
Lake Forest School District
Laurel School District
Milford School District
New Castle County Vocational-Technical School District (County-wide overlay school district)
Polytech School District (County-wide overlay school district)
Red Clay Consolidated School District
Seaford School District
Smyrna School District
Sussex Technical School District (County-wide overlay school district)
Woodbridge School District

Direct state schools

Delaware School for the Deaf/Margaret S. Sterck School (Operated under contract to the Christina School District)
Ferris School (Operated by state Youth Rehabilitative Services)
First State School (Operated under contract to Christiana Care Health System)
George Washington Carver Vocational School (Closed in 1953)
James H. Groves Adult High School (Operated directly by state Department of Education)

Historical Districts
Prior to 1968, there were 50 school districts in the state. This changed to 26 in 1969. In 1978 the New Castle County School District formed from 11 school districts in that county; however in 1981 it was divided into four school districts. Since 1981 Delaware has 19 school districts. In 2009 there were proposals to change the number of districts to three, one per county, to save costs, although various parents in the state preferred having local school districts so individual communities could have more influence over education.

Table

References

External links
List of Delaware School Districts from the Delaware Department of Education
List of Delaware School Districts from GreatSchools.net

See also
List of charter schools in Delaware

Further reading
 
 
  

Delaware
School Districts
School Districts